Strahinja Banović (film) may refer to
 The Falcon (1981) by Vatroslav Mimica
 As Far as I Can Walk (2021) by Stefan Arsenijević

Disambiguation pages